HiPhi is an automobile manufacturer headquartered in Shanghai, specializing in designing and developing electric vehicles. HiPhi is the brand under the Human Horizons company focusing on the development of new energy vehicles. The first vehicle, HiPhi X, was launched on July 31, 2019, and has a range of 400 miles.

History
The HiPhi brand was launched on July 31, 2019, by Human Horizons alongside its first concept car, the HiPhi 1.

On October 16, 2019, Nicolas Huet joined the company and served as the vice president of HiPhi Design.

In April 2020, HiPhi's first brand experience store opened in Lujiazui, Shanghai.

The first model, the HiPhi X was officially available on the Chinese market in October 2020 and the first batch of production cars were delivered in May 2021. The second model, the HiPhi Z debuted in November 2021.

According to the monthly auto sales report released by the China Automotive Technology & Research Center, the HiPhi X was the best selling premium electric vehicle in China as of September 2021, taking over the Porsche Taycan in second place.

Products

HiPhi X

The first product of the HiPhi brand is the HiPhi X electric full-size crossover SUV, essentially the production version of the HiPhi 1 Concept. The vehicle is equipped with "NT Doors"access system, dual redundant L3 self-driving, 360-degree encircled panoramic driving environment perception system, large passenger screen, equipped with PML programmable intelligent headlight system +ISD intelligent interactive lamps. As of January 2022, 4,200 HiPhi X vehicles were sold.

HiPhi Z 

The HiPhi Z 5-door shooting brake is the second model of the HiPhi brand. Revealed in November 2021, the HiPhi Z is positioned as a second flagship vehicle of the brand and is based on the same platform as the Hiphi X. The vehicle unveiled in November 2021 is a pre-production prototype concept with 95 percent of the design expected to reach production with the production model set to launch in April 2022 at the 2022 Beijing Auto Show officially.

References

Electric vehicle manufacturers of China
Car brands
Car manufacturers of China
Manufacturing companies based in Shanghai
Chinese brands